Porsuk is a village in Ulukışla district Niğde Province, Turkey.

Economy 
Agricultural products of the village are tomatoes, cucumbers, beans, potatoes, onions, peppers, corn, peas, sunflowers, lentils, cabbage, cherry, sour cherry, apple, peach, pear, mulberry, blackberry, grape, walnut, plum, apricot.

Village Society 
Old Porsuk village headmen: Ömer Erdem, Hacı Ali Güldür, Mulla Mehmet Ünal, Rıza Arıkan, İbrahim Zeki Erdem. At the present time, Ramazan Ünsal is the reeve since 2005.

See also
Porsuk Inscription

References

Villages in Ulukışla District